The People's Revolutionary Front (Marxist–Leninist–Maoist) (Spanish: Frente Revolucionario del Pueblo (Marxista–Leninista–Maoísta)) is a Bolivian communist party of the Marxist–Leninist–Maoist orientation. They are ideologically close to the Communist Party of Peru.

They are opposed to the Evo Morales government and aspire to conduct what they deem as "People's War" in their homeland, similar to the conflicts in India, Peru, the Philippines and formerly Nepal. They are closely aligned to the Revolutionary Internationalist Movement.

See also
Communist Party of Ecuador–Red Sun
Revolutionary Communist Party of Argentina
Revolutionary Communist Group of Colombia

References

External links
FRP-MLM Homepage (old)
https://frpbolivia.wordpress.com/ (current) 

Communist militant groups
Communist parties in Bolivia
Far-left politics in Bolivia
Maoism in South America
Maoist parties
Political parties in Bolivia
Political parties with year of establishment missing